Mark Ellis or Marc Ellis may refer to:

Athletes
 Mark Ellis (baseball) (born 1977), Major League Baseball player
 Mark Ellis (cricketer) (born 1962), English former cricketer
 Mark Ellis (footballer, born 1962), English footballer who played for Bradford City
 Mark Ellis (footballer, born 1988), English footballer who plays for Barrow
 Mark Ellis (hurler) (born 1990), Irish hurler
 Marc Ellis (rugby) (born 1971), New Zealand rugby league and union footballer

Other people
 Mark Ellis (actor), Canadian actor
 Mark Ellis (lawyer) (born 1957), English/American international lawyer
 Mark Ellis (American author), American novelist and comic-book writer
 Mark Ellis (Formula One), British Formula One engineer
 Mark Ellis (Welsh author), Welsh thriller writer
 Mark Ellis (yacht designer), Canadian/American sailboat designer
 Marc H. Ellis (born 1952), theologian and philosopher
 Flood (producer) or Mark Ellis, English producer and recording engineer